Cremosano is a comune (municipality) in the Province of Cremona in the Italian region Lombardy, located about  east of Milan and about  northwest of Cremona.

Cremosano borders the following municipalities: Campagnola Cremasca, Casaletto Vaprio, Crema, Trescore Cremasco.

References

Cities and towns in Lombardy